Ambrogio Del Giudice, also known as Ambrosius de Altamura or just Altamura  (Altamura, November 16, 1608 - 1677), was an Italian Dominican and historian.

Life 
Born in Altamura, an Italian city located in the Kingdom of Naples (that is why he was called Ambrosius de Altamura or just Altamura), Ambrogio del Giudice was a member of the del Giudice family. After being ordained fray of the  Dominican Order in Altamura's Dominican monastery (most likely, "Convento di San Rocco") and completing all the degrees of study available in his hometown, in 1647 he was appointed Master of the "Capitolo generale" of the Kingdom of Valencia. He was also appointed regent of Saint Dominic in the city of Andria. According to Toppi, del Giudice was probably in Rome right before his death. He died in 1677.

He is best known for his work Bibliotechae Dominicanae (1677), a kind of historical compendium of prominent personalities from the Middle Ages until the 17th century, among which many were personalities somehow related to the Dominican Order. This work was then cited and used by many subsequent historians, such as Jacques Quétif and Jacques Échard inside their work Scriptores Ordinis Praedicatorum (1721). Despite his notoriety, the above authors Quétif and Echard also noted some inaccuracies and mistakes in Ambrogio del Giudice's work. He also wrote other works, some of which have survived and are stored in a few Italian libraries. Other works such as the Chronologia, which Ambrogio del Giudice himself cites in his own Bibliotechae Dominicanae are lost; the Chronologia was not published or was lost as early as the year 1753.

Works

See also 
 Altamura
 Jacques Quétif
 Jacques Échard

References

Bibliography 
 
 
 
 
 
 
 
 
 
 
 
 
 
 

1608 births
1677 deaths
Altamura
Italian Dominicans
Italian historians